Nebria kaszabi is a species of ground beetle in the Nebriinae subfamily that can be found in Mongolia and Russia.

References

kaszabi
Beetles described in 1982
Beetles of Asia